was a Japanese politician and cabinet minister in the Meiji, Taishō and early Shōwa periods  of the Japan.

Biography
Motoda was born in Bungo Province in what is now part of Kunisaki, Ōita, where his father, Inomata Eizo was a doctor. He was adopted by Motoda Naoshi, a samurai in the service of Kitsuki Domain on his marriage to Motoda’s daughter. Following the Meiji Restoration, he went to Tokyo, and graduated from Tokyo Imperial University with a legal degree in 1880. In the first Japanese general election of 1890, Motoda was elected to the lower house of the Diet of Japan. He was reelected 16 times, mostly under the Rikken Seiyūkai party, serving for over 40 years, including three terms as Vice-Speaker of the House from 1889-1892.

Under the administration of Prime Minister Yamamoto Gonnohyōe (1913–1914), Motoda was appointed Communications Minister. He subsequently served as the first Railroad Minister, when that cabinet-level post was created under the Hara Takashi administration in May 1920. He continued in the same post under the Takahashi Korekiyo administration until the collapse of that administration in June 1922.

Motoda became Speaker of the House from 20 April 1928 to 14 March 1929.
In 1932, he was appointed to the Privy Council, the first party politician to receive this honor. His grave is at the Aoyama Cemetery in Tokyo.

References

External links

1858 births
1938 deaths
People from Ōita Prefecture
Rikken Seiyūkai politicians
Members of the House of Representatives (Empire of Japan)
University of Tokyo alumni
Government ministers of Japan